Pseudorgyia is a genus of moths in the family Erebidae. The genus was erected by Leon F. Harvey in 1875.

Taxonomy
The genus was previously classified in the subfamily Calpinae of the family Noctuidae.

Species
 Pseudorgyia russula Grote, 1883
 Pseudorgyia versuta Harvey, 1875

References

Scolecocampinae
Moth genera

Taxa named by Leon F. Harvey